The Quincy Gems was the primary name of the minor league baseball team in Quincy, Illinois, that played in various seasons from 1883 to 1973. 

Quincy teams played as members of the Midwest League (1960–1973), Illinois-Indiana-Iowa League (1946–1956),  Mississippi Valley League (1933), Illinois-Indiana-Iowa League (1911–1917, 1925–1932), Central Association (1908–1910), Iowa State League (1907), Western Association (1894–1898), Illinois-Iowa League (1891–1892), Central Interstate League (1889–1890) and Northwestern League (1883–1884). Quincy won league championships in 1889, 1913, 1929, 1931, 1951, 1953, 1954, 1961 and 1970.

Baseball Hall of Fame members Bruce Sutter, Tony Kubek and Whitey Herzog played for Quincy teams. 

The Quincy Gems name returned in 2009 with the Gems playing in the collegiate summer Prospect League.

History
Beginning play in 1883, Quincy minor league teams played as members of the Midwest League (1960–1973), Illinois-Indiana-Iowa League (1946–1956), Mississippi Valley League (1933), Illinois-Indiana-Iowa League (1911–1917, 1925–1932). Central Association (1908–1910), Iowa State League (1907), Central Interstate League (1889–1890), Western Association (1894–1898), Illinois-Iowa League (1891–1892), Central Interstate League (1889–1890) and Northwestern League (1883–1884).

After beginning play in 1883 as the Quincy Quincys, the team was first called the "Gems" in 1907 and had various other nicknames. Besided the Gems moniker Quincy minor league teams played as the (Quincy Cubs (1965–1973), Quincy Jets (1962–1963), Quincy Giants (1960–1961), Quincy Indians (1928–1933), Quincy Red Birds (1925–1927), Quincy Old Soldiers (1912), Quincy Infants (1911), Quincy Vets (1909–1910), Quincy Giants (1899), Quincy (1898), Quincy Little Giants (1897), Quincy Blue Birds (1896), Quincy Ravens (1890–1892, 1894), Quincy Black Birds (1889) and Quincy Quincys (1883–1884)).

The team was known as the Quincy Ravens from 1890 to 1892, and then again in 1894. The team played in the Illinois Iowa League in 1891 and 1892, before moving to the Western Association in 1894. They were managed by Sam LaRocque and William Wittrock in 1892. Several major leaguers played for the Ravens, one of the most prominent being Sam Gillen who played for the Pittsburgh Pirates and Philadelphia Phillies.  During the 1981 season, Pete Daniels threw 321 innings compiling a 0.79 ERA for the Ravens.    

The franchise played in the Western Association (1894–1899), Iowa State League (1907), Central Association (1908–1910), Three-I League (1911–1932, 1946–1956), and the Midwest League (1960–73). They were affiliated with the New York Yankees (1946–1956), the San Francisco Giants (1956–60), New York Mets (1962–63) and the Chicago Cubs (1965–1973).

Overall, the franchise won a total of nine league championships. Quincy captured the Western Association championship in 1889, and Three-I League Championships in 1913, 1929, 1931, 1951, 1953 and 1954. Quincy won the 1961 and 1970 Midwest League Championships, defeating the Waterloo Hawks in 1961 and the Quad City Angels in 1970.

After the 1973 season, the franchise was moved to Dubuque, Iowa  playing as the Dubuque Packers in the Midwest League for two seasons, before the franchise was folded and not replaced.

The Gems name returned in 2009 by the collegiate summer Prospect League team called the Gems, who also play at a renovated Q Stadium.

The ballparks
Beginning in 1946, Quincy teams played at Q Stadium. 

Previously, the team played at Eagles Stadium, which was located at the same site. 

Q Stadium was constructed on the Eagles Stadium site as a Works Project Administration project in 1939. Q stadium is still an active baseball stadium, located at 1800 Sycamore Street, Quincy, IL 62301. The stadium is bounded by Sycamore Street (north, left field); football stadium and North 20th Street (east, right field); Spruce Street (south, first base); and North 18th Street (west, third base).

In 1984, the stadium was purchased by Quincy University from the City of Quincy for $1.00. Today, Q Stadium is home to Quincy University teams and the collegiate summer baseball team of the same name, the new Quincy Gems.

Year-by-year record

Notable alumni

Baseball Hall of Fame Alumni
Whitey Herzog (1952)  Inducted, 2010
Tony Kubek (1955) Ford C. Frick Award, 2009
Bruce Sutter (1973)  Inducted, 2006

Notable alumni
Hank Bauer (1946) 6x MLB All-Star; 1966 MLB Manager of the Year; Baltimore Orioles Hall of Fame
Lew Burdette (1948) 2× MLB All-Star; 1957 World Series MVP; Braves Hall of Fame
Jim Finigan (1964) 2x MLB All-Star
 Jim Ray Hart (1960) MLB all-Star
 Woodie Held (1953)
 Vern Hoscheit (1953-1956) 
Walter Holke (1929)
Baby Doll Jacobson (1929) .311 Lifetime Batting Average
 Buddy Kerr (1960, MGR) MLB All-Star
Pete LaCock (1970)
Dennis Lamp (1973)
Hal Lanier (1961) MLB MGR: 1986 NL Manager of the Year
 Sam Mertes (1894) 1903 NL RBI Leader
Joe Niekro (1966) MLB All-Star; Houston Astros Hall of Fame
Bill North (1970) 1974, 1975 AL Stolen Base Leader
 Fritz Ostermueller (1926) 1938 NL Saves Leader
 Ray Powell (1931)
 Gary Ross (1967)
 Hal Smith (1951)
 Russ Snyder (1954) 
 Tom Sturdivant (1948-1950)
 Gus Suhr (1925) MLB All-Star
 Steve Sundra (1932)
Lee Thomas (1955) 2x MLB All-Star
Marv Throneberry (1953) Miller Lite commercials
 Hal Trosky (1932) 1936 AL RBI Leader; Cleveland Indians Hall of Fame
Rabbit Warstler (1927)
 Dutch Zwilling (1951) 1914 NL Home Run Leader; 1915 NL RBI Leader

See also
Quincy (minor league baseball) players
Quincy Blackbirds players
Quincy Bluebirds players
Quincy Browns  players
Quincy Cubs players
Quincy Gems players
Quincy Giants players
Quincy Indians players
Quincy Infants players
Quincy Jets players
Quincy Little Giants players
Quincy Old Soldiers players
Quincy Quincys players
Quincy Ravens players 
Quincy Red Birds players,
Quincy Vets players,

Photos

References

Baseball teams established in 1883
Defunct Midwest League teams
Defunct baseball teams in Illinois
New York Yankees minor league affiliates
Professional baseball teams in Illinois
Central Association
Illinois-Indiana-Iowa League teams
San Francisco Giants minor league affiliates
Sports teams in Quincy, Illinois
1883 establishments in Illinois
1973 disestablishments in Illinois
Quincy, Illinois
Central Association teams
Iowa State League teams
Baseball teams disestablished in 1973